Sir Arthur Eric Courtney Drake  (29 November 1910 – 31 October 1996) was an English oilman. Drake was the fifth chairman of the board of British Petroleum, serving from 1969 to 1975.

Drake was born in Rochester, Kent, the son of a doctor, and educated at Pembroke College, Cambridge, where he received a bachelor's degree in law.

In 1975, he was by succeeded Sir David Steel as chairman of BP.

References

1910 births
1996 deaths
Alumni of Pembroke College, Cambridge
British businesspeople in the oil industry
British chairpersons of corporations
British chief executives in the energy industry
Businesspeople awarded knighthoods
Chairmen of BP
History of the petroleum industry in the United Kingdom
Knights Bachelor
People from Rochester, Kent